Home for Christmas is a Christmas album and the seventh studio album by American singer Sheryl Crow, first released in 2008 exclusively at Hallmark stores. The album was re-released in 2010 exclusively at Target stores with new artwork. In 2011, it finally received a major release worldwide, on CD and as a digital download. As of December 2011, it has sold 40,000 copies in the US.

Crow previously recorded "Blue Christmas" in 1997 as part of the A Very Special Christmas 3 collection, in a completely different arrangement.

Track listing

Note: "O Holy Night" features a minute-long intro of "It Came Upon the Midnight Clear".

Charts

Album

Singles

References

Sheryl Crow albums
2008 Christmas albums
Albums produced by Bill Bottrell
A&M Records albums
Christmas albums by American artists